Chris Mars (born April 26, 1961) is an American painter and musician. He was the drummer for the seminal Minneapolis based alternative-rock band The Replacements from 1979 to 1990, and later joined the informal supergroup Golden Smog before beginning a solo career. While Mars concentrates mainly on his art career, he still occasionally releases new music.

Biography

The Replacements 

In Rolling Stone's Alt Rock-a-Rama, Mars detailed the kind of hell-raising that he and the other Replacements—singer-guitarist Paul Westerberg, lead guitarist Bob Stinson, and bassist Tommy Stinson—indulged in when they were together. Among other incidents, Mars was thrown in jail for playing chicken with an unmarked police car. Also, in conjunction with Bob Stinson, he sabotaged a gig where he knew there would be a lot of record-industry personnel in attendance by going to a novelty store and purchasing some bottles of stink juice. Mars sometimes transformed into an alter ego named Papi the Clown while on tour; he would paint his face when inebriated and spook the band and road crew.

Mars appeared on only a few songs on the Replacements' final album, All Shook Down (1990), and left before the subsequent tour, unhappy with Westerberg's increasing control of the band.

Solo career 
Mars's first solo album, Horseshoes and Hand Grenades (1992), was a revelation for fans and critics used to his fairly limited role in The Replacements. He wrote every track and played drums, guitar, and keyboards in addition to handling all lead and backing vocals. Except for the presence of bass guitarist J.D. Foster and brief contributions from Soul Asylum's Dave Pirner and Dan Murphy, it was essentially a D.I.Y. affair. Mars followed it up a year later with 75% Less Fat.

Mars wasn't interested in touring behind his third album, Tenterhooks (1995), so another band, The Wallmen, toured behind it with a cardboard cutout of Mars placed onstage. He released one more album, Anonymous Botch (1996), before fully turning his full creative attention to his visual-art career.

Mars self-published a fifth album, Note to Self, in 2017. He announced the news on Twitter and later on his Facebook page.

Painting career 
His painting style, examples of which grace all of his album covers, is marked by nightmarish landscapes and grotesque, distorted figures. He draws inspiration from his older brother's struggle with schizophrenia.

He generally likes to use oils or pastels, although he ventures into other media, like acrylic and scratchboard. He created a 13-minute animated film about his work titled The Severed Stream.

His work, which has fetched prices of more than $30,000, has been shown throughout the United States and Canada. He has had solo exhibitions at Billy Shire Fine Arts, The Erie Art Museum, The Minneapolis Institute of Arts, The Steensland Museum, Coker Bell Gallery and the Mesa Arts Center.

Personal life 
Mars lives in Minneapolis with his wife, Sally Mars.

Discography

Solo albums 
 Horseshoes & Hand Grenades (Smash, 1992)
 75% Less Fat (Smash, 1993)
 Tenterhooks (Bar/None, 1995)
 Anonymous Botch (Bar/None, 1996)
 Note to Self (self-published, 2017)

Exhibitions and Collections

Museum exhibitions (solo) 

 2021: Musee de la Bande Dessinee d'Angouleme, Angouleme, France
 2010: Mesa Contemporary Arts, Mesa, AZ
 2010: Erie Art Museum, Erie, PA
 2010: Phipps Center for the Arts, Hudson, WI
 2010: Erie Art Museum, Erie, PA
 2010: Phipps Center for the Arts, Hudson, WI
 2009: Longview Museum of Fine Arts, Longview, TX
 2009: Longview Museum of Fine Arts, Longview, TX
 2005: Minneapolis Institute of Art, Minneapolis, MN
 2004: Erie Art Museum, Erie, PA
 2000: Steensland Art Museum, Northfield, MN

Notes

External links 

Chris Mars site
Interview with Chris Mars
Chris Mars' paintings at Beinart Gallery
Jonathan LeVine Gallery

1961 births
Living people
American rock drummers
The Replacements (band) members
Artists from Minneapolis
Musicians from Minnesota
Musicians from Minneapolis
20th-century American drummers
American male drummers
Golden Smog members
20th-century American male musicians
21st-century American artists
Bar/None Records artists